Montenegrin municipal elections were held in all 21 municipalities, between June 2004 and October 2006. It resulted in the victory of the ruling DPS-SDP coalition in 15 out of 21 municipalities, where they secured a majority, alone or in a coalition with national minority parties.

Results

Herceg Novi
Mayoral

Round One
Registered voters: 23,490
Votes: 14,750
Valid votes: 11,660 (97.9%)
Invalid votes: 255 (2.1%)
Turnout: 62.8%
Stanko Zloković - 5,931 (41.3%)
Dejan Mandić - 5,326 (37.1%) 
Vasilije Ilić - 1,201 (8.4%)
Savo Zarubica - 593 (4.1%) 
Nada Setenčić - 489 (3.4%) 
Helena Vučetić - 405 (2.8%) 
Olivera Doklestić - 405 (2.8%) 

Round Two
Registered voters: 23,490
Votes: 15,952
Valid votes: 15,694 (98.4%)
Turnout: 67.9%

Dejan Mandić - 8,402 (53.5%) 
Stanko Zloković - 7,292 (46.5%) 

Parliamentary
Registered voters: 23,437
Votes: 14,713
Valid votes: 14,203 (96.6%)
Invalid votes: 510 (3.4%)
Turnout: 62.68%

Kotor
Mayoral

Round One
Registered voters: 17,301
Votes: 10,793
Valid votes: 10,396 (96.3%)
Invalid votes: 396 (3.7%)
Turnout: 62.4%

Marija Ćatović - 4,464 (42.9%) 
Branko Ivanović - 3,583 (34.5%)
Andrija Popović- 1,331 (12.8%) 
Emil Kriještorac - 556 (5.3%)
Dragica Perović - 462 (4.4%) 

Round Two
Registered voters: 17,301
Votes: 10,259
Valid votes: 10,010 (97.6%)
Invalid votes: 249 (2.4%)
Turnout: 59.3%

Marija Ćatović - 5,218 (52.1%) 
Branko Ivanović - 4,792 (47.9%)

Parliamentary
Registered voters: 17,301
Votes: 10,793
Valid votes: 10,323 (95.6%)
Invalid votes: 470 (4.4%)
Turnout: 62.4%

Tivat
Mayoral

Round One
Registered voters: 10,495
Votes: 6,062
Valid votes: 5,870 (96.8%)
Invalid votes: 175 (2.9%)
Turnout: 57.8%

Miodrag Kankaraš - 2,378 (40.5%)
Lj. Samardžić - 1,725 (29.4%) 
Z. Petković - 1,305 (22.2%) 
V. Kovačević - 361 (6.1%)
Radoš Gospić - 118 (2%) 

Round Two
Registered voters: 10,495
Votes: 6,031
Valid votes: 5,834 (96.7%)
Invalid votes: 197 (3.3%)
Turnout: 57.5%

Miodrag Kankaraš - 3,158 (54.1%)
Lj. Samardžić - 2,676 (45.9%)

Parliamentary
Registered voters: 10,495
Votes: 6,062
Valid votes: 5,861 (96.7%)
Invalid votes: 201 (3.3%)
Turnout: 57.8%

Žabljak
Registered voters: 3,405
Votes: 2,892
Valid votes: 2,785 (96.3%)
Invalid votes: 107 (3.7%)
Turnout: 84.9%

Results in rest of municipalities
In seventeen other municipalities ruling Coalition for European Montenegro (DPS, SDP and HGI) win the power in most municipalities. It seize majority in Podgorica, Nikšić, Rožaje, Bijelo Polje, Budva, Bar, Danilovgrad,
Mojkovac, Cetinje, Plav, Berane and Šavnik as well in Ulcinj where they form an post-election coalition with Democratic Union of Albanians to form local government. While the main opposition coalition Together for Change (SNP-SNS-NS-DSS) has secured the majority and forms the local government in Pljevlja, Plužine, Andrijevica and Kolašin municipalities.

References

2004-06
2004 elections in Europe
2004 in Montenegro
Elections in Serbia and Montenegro